Pramod Kumar Yadav is a Nepalese politician, belonging to the Nepali Congress currently serving as the member of the 1st Federal Parliament of Nepal. In the 2017 Nepalese general election he was elected from the Rupandehi 4 constituency, securing 31718 (51.99%)  votes.

References

Nepal MPs 2017–2022
Living people
Nepali Congress politicians from Lumbini Province
1979 births